The Horsehead Nebula (also known as Barnard 33) is a small dark nebula in the constellation Orion. The nebula is located just to the south of Alnitak, the easternmost star of Orion's Belt, and is part of the much larger Orion molecular cloud complex. It appears within the southern region of the dense dust cloud known as Lynds 1630, along the edge of the much larger, active star-forming H II region called IC 434.

The Horsehead Nebula is approximately 422 parsecs or 1,375 light-years from Earth. It is one of the most identifiable nebulae because of its resemblance to a horse's head.

History
The nebula was discovered by Scottish astronomer Williamina Fleming in 1888 on a photographic plate taken at the Harvard College Observatory. One of the first descriptions was made by E. E. Barnard, describing it as: "Dark mass, diam. 4′, on nebulous strip extending south from ζ Orionis", cataloguing the dark nebula as Barnard 33.

Structure

The dark cloud of dust and gas is a region in the Orion molecular cloud complex, where star formation is taking place. It is located in the constellation of Orion, which is prominent in the winter evening sky in the Northern Hemisphere and the summer evening sky in the Southern Hemisphere.

Colour images reveal a deep-red colour that originates from ionised hydrogen gas (Hα) predominantly behind the nebula, and caused by the nearby bright star Sigma Orionis. Magnetic fields channel the gases, leaving the nebula into streams, shown as foreground streaks against the background glow. A glowing strip of hydrogen gas marks the edge of the enormous cloud, and the densities of nearby stars are noticeably different on either side.

Heavy concentrations of dust in the Horsehead Nebula region and neighbouring Orion Nebula are localized into interstellar clouds, resulting in alternating sections of nearly complete opacity and transparency. The darkness of the Horsehead is caused mostly by thick dust blocking the light of stars behind it. The lower part of the Horsehead's neck casts a shadow to the left. The visible dark nebula emerging from the gaseous complex is an active site of the formation of "low-mass" stars. Bright spots in the Horsehead Nebula's base are young stars just in the process of forming.

Image gallery

See also
List of Hubble anniversary images

Notes

References

External links

 SOFIA/upGREAT [C II] Velocity Resolved Map of the Horsehead Nebula
 The Horsehead Nebula @ The Electronic Sky
 Hubble Observes the Horsehead Nebula
 The discovery of early photographs of the Horsehead nebula, by Waldee and Hazen
 The Horsehead Nebula in the 19th Century, by Waldee
 Detection of new nebulae by photography, by Pickering
 Horsehead Nebula at ESA/Hubble
 The Horsehead Nebula at the Astro-Photography site of Mr. T. Yoshida.
 The Horsehead-Nebula and neighboring structures in a classical view
 The Horsehead Nebula on interactive astro-photography survey at Wikisky.org
 The Horsehead Nebula at Constellation Guide

 
Orion (constellation)
Dark nebulae
Barnard 33
Star formation
Barnard objects